The PR-72P class are a series of French-designed corvettes in service with the Peruvian Navy. Six units were ordered in 1976 by the Peruvian Navy from the Société Française de Construction Navale (SFCN). Subsequently, three of them were built by the company's own Villeneuve-la-Garenne shipyard, and the rest subcontracted to Lorient Naval Dockyard. Pennant numbers were originally P-101 to P-106, but were later modified to CM-21 to CM-26, where CM stands for corbeta misilera, Spanish for guided missile corvette.

Ships

In 1998 the Peruvian Navy signed a contract with MTU to re-engine three PR-72P-class corvettes. The other units are expected to be similarly modified in the near future.

Sources

 Baker III, Arthur D., The Naval Institute Guide to Combat Fleets of the World 2002-2003. Naval Institute Press, 2002.
 Sharpe, Richard (ed.), Jane's Fighting Ships 1990 - 91. Jane's Information Group, 1990.

Corvette classes